Wat Pa Daeng (literally "red forest temple") is a Buddhist temple located in Chiang Mai, Thailand. Wat Pa Daeng historically served as the center for the Araññavasi forest-dwelling monks, who established a new sect at this monastery. The temple is near Wat Umong.

The temple's main chedi incorporates both Mon Haripunjaya and Sinhalese styles. The ubosot was built by King Tilokaraj in 1452, and the temple's foundation was laid by his mother in 1447. Tilokaraj's parents were cremated at this temple.

References

External links

Pa Daeng